Paul (Pávlos; 14 December 1901 – 6 March 1964) was King of Greece from 1 April 1947 until his death in 1964. He was succeeded by his son, Constantine II.

Paul was first cousin to Prince Philip, Duke of Edinburgh and father-in-law to Juan Carlos I of Spain.

Early life 

Paul was born on 14 December 1901 at the Tatoi Palace in Attica north of Athens, the third son of King Constantine I of Greece and his wife, Princess Sophia of Prussia. He trained as an army officer at the Royal Military College, Sandhurst and later at the Hellenic Military Academy in Kypseli, Athens. Paul was an army officer cadet in the Coldstream Guards and Lieutenant with the Evzones. To his family, he was known as Palo.

From 1917 to 1920, Paul lived in exile with his father, Constantine I. From 1923 to 1935, he lived in exile again in England, this time with his brother, George II. He worked briefly in an aircraft factory under an alias, and through Viscount Tredegar met and befriended notorious literary muse Denham Fouts, who later alleged an affair., claiming they had themselves identically tattooed with a small blue insignia above the heart. A friend of Fouts, John B. L. Goodwin said Fouts often made up stories about his life, and literary critic Katherine Bucknell thought many of the tales about him were myths. Henry Channon wrote in his diary that Paul was a bisexual rake before his marriage.

Marriage and children 
On 9 January 1938, Paul married Princess Frederica of Hanover, his first cousin once removed through Frederick III, German Emperor, and Victoria, Princess Royal, and second cousin through Christian IX of Denmark, in Athens. They had three children:

 Sophia, Queen of Spain (born 1938)
 Constantine II, King of the Hellenes (1940–2023)
 Irene (born 1942)

World War II 
During most of World War II, from 1941 to 1946, when Greece was under German occupation, Paul was with the Greek government-in-exile in London and Cairo. From Cairo, he broadcast messages to the Greek people.

Reign 
Paul returned to Greece in 1946. He succeeded to the throne in 1947, upon the death of his childless elder brother, King George II, during the Greek Civil War (between Greek Communists and the non-communist Greek government). In 1947 he was unable to attend the wedding of his first cousin, Prince Philip, Duke of Edinburgh to the future Queen Elizabeth II of the United Kingdom as he was suffering from typhoid fever.

By 1949 the Civil War was effectively over, with the Communist insurgents ceasing the majority of their operations, and the task of rebuilding the shattered north of the country began.

In the 1950s Greece recovered economically, and diplomatic and trade links were strengthened by Paul’s state visits abroad. He became the first Greek Monarch to visit a Turkish Head of State. However, links with Britain became strained over Cyprus, where the majority Greek population favored union with Greece, which Britain, as the colonial power, would not endorse. Eventually, Cyprus became an independent state in 1960.

In December 1959, Prince Maximillian of Bavaria presented King Otto's coronation regalia to Paul. It had been almost a century since they were last in Greece.

Meanwhile, republican sentiment was growing in Greece. Both Paul and Frederica attracted criticism for their interference in politics, frequent foreign travels, and the cost of maintaining the Royal Family. Paul responded by economising and donated his private estate at Polidendri to the State.

In 1959, he had an operation for a cataract, and in 1963 an emergency operation for appendicitis. In late February 1964, he underwent a further operation for stomach cancer, and about a week later on 6 March 1964, King Paul I died in Athens. He was succeeded by his son, Constantine II.

Foreign honours 
 :
 Honorary Knight Grand Cross Royal Victorian Order - 1937
 Honorary Admiral Royal Navy - Feb 1953
 Stranger Knight of the Order of the Garter - 1963

Legacy 
In March 2014, a memorial service took place in the grounds of Tatoi Palace in Athens commemorating the fiftieth anniversary of Paul's death. Members of the Greek and Spanish royal families were present.

Ancestry

Notes and sources

References 
 Bucknell, Katherine (1996). Christopher Isherwood Diaries: Volume One 1939–1960 London: Methuen. 
 Clarke, Gerald (1988). Capote: A Biography. London: Hamish Hamilton. 
 Clogg, Richard (1992). A Concise History of Greece, Cambridge University Press
 Vanderbilt, Arthur (2014). Best-Kept Boy in the World: The Life and Loves of Denny Fouts. Magnus Books
 Van der Kiste, John (1994). Kings of the Hellenes. Stroud, Gloucestershire: Alan Sutton Publishing. 
 Wishart, Michael (1977). High Diver. Blond and Briggs
 Woodhouse, C.M. (1998). Modern Greece: A Short History, Mackays of Chatham, Kent
Μιχάλης Φύλλας, «Στιγμές από την ιστορία της σύγχρονης Ελληνικής θεολογίας. Ο βασιλιάς Παύλος και η «Ένωση Ελλήνων Θεολόγων», Σύναξη, τχ.156, (Οκτώβριος-Δεκέμβριος 2020), σελ.85-88.

External links 
 

Kings of Greece
Eastern Orthodox monarchs
1901 births
1964 deaths
20th-century Greek monarchs
Nobility from Athens
Greek princes
Danish princes
Field marshals of Greece
House of Glücksburg (Greece)
Burials at Tatoi Palace Royal Cemetery
Knights of the Golden Fleece of Spain
Bailiffs Grand Cross of the Order of St John
Order of George I
Order of Saints George and Constantine
Extra Knights Companion of the Garter
Recipients of the Order of Saint-Charles
Honorary Knights Grand Cross of the Royal Victorian Order
Grand Commanders of the Order of the Dannebrog
Commander's Crosses of the Cross of Valour (Greece)
Recipients of the Grand Star of the Decoration for Services to the Republic of Austria
Recipients of the Order of the Phoenix (Greece)
Order of Beneficence (Greece)
Knights Grand Cross of the Order of Saints Maurice and Lazarus
Grand Croix of the Légion d'honneur
Knights Grand Cross with Collar of the Order of Merit of the Italian Republic
Collars of the Order of Isabella the Catholic
1950s in Greek politics
1960s in Greek politics
20th-century Greek people
Grand Crosses Special Class of the Order of Merit of the Federal Republic of Germany
Greek people of Danish descent
Greek people of German descent
Deaths from cancer in Greece
Deaths from stomach cancer
Sons of kings
Grand Crosses of the Order of Saint-Charles